Lahore Medical and Dental College (abbreviated as LMDC), established in 1997, is a private college of medicine and dentistry located in Tulspura, Lahore, Punjab, Pakistan. It is registered with PMDC and affiliated with University of Health Sciences, Lahore (UHS). Doctors Hospital, Surgimed Hospital and Ghurki Trust Teaching Hospital are attached as training and teaching hospitals.

Associated colleges 
 Lahore Medical college
 Lahore Dental college
 LPC(Lahore Pharmacy College)
 LCPT(Lahore College of Physiotherapy)
 Ruth Pfau College of Nutritional sciences
 Ruth Pfau College of Biotechnology

Academic programs 
 MBBS
 BDS
 D-Pharm
 DPT
 Nursing
 Allied Health Sciences
 Biotechnology

Teaching Hospitals 
 Ghurki Trust Hospital
 Doctors Hospital
 Surgimed Hospital

Academic Facilities 
 IT Lab
 Library with free Wi-fi
 Anatomy museum
 Histology laboratory
 Dissection hall
 Pathology lab
 Biotechnology lab
 Physiology lab
 Biochemistry lab

Campus life 
 Centrally air-conditioned Building
 State of the art lecture theatres
 Cafeteria
 Free Wi-fi for students
 Boys common room
 Girls Common room
 Girls gymnasium
 Boys Gymnasium
 State of the art auditorium

Student bodies 
 Official fb page
 Official Insta page

 Arts and Photography Club

 Dramatics Society

 Memetics Society

Hostel Facilities 
 Separate hostels for girls & boys
 Gym
 Internet 
 Mess hall
 Air-conditioned study rooms
 Indoor Sports room
 Common room for boys & girls
 Single & shared rooms

External links
 

Medical colleges in Pakistan
Dental schools in Pakistan